Comfort zone is a behavioural state within which a person operates in an anxiety-neutral condition.

Comfort zone or Comfort Zone may also refer to:

Zones
 Thermal comfort, a term used in association with comfort zones in building construction 
 Circumstellar habitable zone, the region in a star system where an Earth-like planet can maintain liquid water on its surface

Books
Comfort Zone, a novel by Brian W. Aldiss
The Comfort Zone, a novel by Jeremy Sheldon

Music 
Comfort Zone, a 1980 album by Steven Halpern
 Comfort Zone (album), a 1999 album by Sector Seven
 The Comfort Zone (album), a 1991 album by Vanessa L. Williams
 "The Comfort Zone" (song), a 1991 Vanessa Williams single from the album
 "Comfort Zone" by The Answer from Everyday Demons
 ComfortZone, a 2014 mixtape by Saba

Places
 The Comfort Zone (nightclub), a Toronto, Canada dance club venue

See also 
 Goldilocks principle